The Murasame-class destroyer was a destroyer class built for the Japan Maritime Self-Defense Force (JMSDF) in the late 1950s as a successor to the  destroyers. Like its predecessor, its main task was anti-submarine warfare, but its improved weaponry also enabled it to perform better in the anti-air role, so this class was classified as "DDA" (anti-air destroyer or all purpose destroyer) unofficially.

The sensor suite and weapon system was almost the same as the one of the latter batch of the Ayanami class, but three 5-inch/54 caliber Mark 16 guns (with Mark 39 single mounts) were added to extend effective range against air and surface threats in addition to four 3-inch/50 caliber Mark 22 guns (with Mark 33 dual mounts). The 5-inch guns were controlled by one Mark 57 GFCS, and the 3-inch guns were done by one Mark 63 controller. The main air-search radar was an OPS-1, the Japanese version of the American AN/SPS-6.

Ships

References 

 

Destroyer classes